This is a list of notable stars in the constellation Triangulum, sorted by decreasing brightness.

See also 
 List of stars by constellation

References 
 
 
 

List
Triangulum